The Hertfordshire and Essex High School and since 2004 named as The Hertfordshire & Essex High School and Science College, commonly referred as Herts and Essex is a secondary level comprehensive single-sex school and a mixed-sex sixth form on Warwick Road in Bishop's Stortford, Hertfordshire, England.

History
It was opened as The Bishop's Stortford Secondary School for Girls in 1909, the school was built to have an intake of around 120 fee-paying students, at the time of opening it was run by both the counties of Hertfordshire and Essex and therefore, it later changed its name to the Hertfordshire and Essex Girls' High School. It then became a comprehensive in the 1970s when the school was renamed again to its current name, The Hertfordshire and Essex High School.

Following the outbreak of The Second World War in 1939, thousands of London children were evacuated to the relative safety of the countryside, many finding themselves in Bishop’s Stortford. Pupils from Clapton County Secondary School for Girls in Hackney, East London, were specifically sent here to be educated at this school. But with few teachers and little space, local children were taught in the mornings and London children in the afternoons.

During its 100-year history, the school has changed significantly with many new buildings being added to the original Edwardian School House to allow for just under 10 times the number of students it had in 1910. Between 2000 and 2004, the school benefited from a substantial redevelopment which included new IT suites, refectory, sports facilities, dance studio and Sixth Form Common Room. The project involved the refurbishment of the Edwardian schoolhouse, plus a new build teaching block and sports facilities. The school converted to academy status in April 2014.

Uniform
Introduced in 2013, the uniform for girls in years 7 to 11 is a knee length brown skirt, a yellow blouse and a brown blazer. Previously, from 2010 to 2016, the uniform was a cream and brown stripped blouse, a pleated knee length skirt and a brown blazer. Before that, the skirts were ankle length, as was common at the time to schools in Bishop's Stortford. All Sixth Form students are required to adhere to a dress code of business wear.

Academics
"The Hertfordshire & Essex High School is an outstanding school with an outstanding sixth form"- Ofsted report 2009.

The school is for girls only between the ages of 11 and 16 and has a co-educational sixth form for boys and girls. From 2004, the school has had Science College Status. From 2008, the school has had 'Leadership partner school status'. The school was successful in its bid to become one of the first hundred Teaching Schools in the UK. It has since been involved in system wide support.

Sixth Form
Unlike the rest of the school, boys are permitted to study within the Sixth Form, this is similar to The Bishop's Stortford High School which is a single sex school for boys around a mile away from Herts and Essex, which admits girls to the Sixth Form.

In 2009 Ofsted stated that "The Hertfordshire and Essex High School is an outstanding school with an outstanding Sixth Form".

All students within the Sixth Form are required to take 4 Advanced Subsidiary levels and continue with 3 of these to the full Advanced Level, to continue to Year 13 for the full Advanced Level qualifications, students must achieve 3 AS levels at grades A* - E.

There are also enrichment activities within the Sixth Form where students are off timetable to further their studies or participate within group activities and sports. The school has its own Rugby Union club, which was recently set up by students.

Until September 2010 there was no dress code for students within the Sixth Form, Sixth Formers were allowed to dress in what they believed was appropriate for school, however this was changed shortly after Cathy Tooze, the new Head teacher, joined the school to a dress code of business wear (Suits)

Sixth Form facilities include a large common room and 5 computer and study rooms for students to use in their study periods and during lunch and break.

A large majority of students progress to Russell Group universities, including Oxford and Cambridge universities, which are the UK's top 20 research focused universities.

Sports Centre 
Herts & Essex Sports Centre opened on Friday 20 September 2019. The project has been a collaborative one with funding coming from a variety of bodies and institutions including the Department for Education, Hertfordshire County Council, East Herts District Council, Sport England, Bishop's Stortford Hockey Club, Bishop's Stortford Judo Club as well as staff, students, parents, friends and families who donated via the school's "The Final Hurdle Campaign".

The facility includes:

 4 court badminton sports hall
 Dojo
 Sand-dressed 2G all weather pitch with floodlighting
 6 tennis/netball courts with floodlighting
 Dance studio

Notable former pupils

 Louise Burfitt-Dons, humanitarian campaigner - 1963-67
 Liam Byrne, Labour MP - 1986-88 (sixth form pupil)
 Natasha Devon, social campaigner - 1992-99
 Helen King, Principal of St Anne's College, Oxford and former senior police officer - 1976-83
 Sarah Ockwell-Smith, childcare author - 1987-92
 Caroline Spelman, Conservative MP - 1969-76 (before it was comprehensive)
 Surie, formerly known as Susanna Cork, Singer-Songwriter and represented the United Kingdom at Eurovision in 2018 Lisbon - 2000-05

References

Secondary schools in Hertfordshire
Girls' schools in Hertfordshire
Educational institutions established in 1910
1910 establishments in England
Academies in Hertfordshire
Bishop's Stortford